Antonie may refer to:

 Antonie (given name)
 Antonie (surname)
 Antonie, Lord of Monaco (died 1427)
 Antonie, Masovian Voivodeship, Poland, a village
 Antonie, Silesian Voivodeship, Poland, a village

See also
 Antoni, a given name and surname
 Antony (disambiguation)